Sanjay Prasad (born 21 January 1968) is an Indian politician who served as a Member of the Bihar Legislative Council from Jamui, Bihar. He resigned from Rashtriya Janata Dal and joined Janata Dal (United) with four others.

References

Members of the Bihar Legislative Council
People from Jamui
Living people
1968 births